Ramamoorthy may refer to:

Ramamoorthy Ramesh (born 1960), American materials scientist of Indian descent
T. K. Ramamoorthy (1922–2013), South Indian Tamil music composer and violinist

See also
Viswanathan–Ramamoorthy, South Indian music director duo, composed of M. S. Viswanathan and T. K. Ramamoorthy
Viswanathan Ramamoorthy (film), Indian 2001 Tamil language film directed by Rama Narayanan